Queen Mary College (QMC) is an autonomous academic institution for girls in Lahore, Punjab, Pakistan. It was established on December 10, 1908 as Victoria May Girls High School and renamed in honor of the Queen Consort of King George V in 1911. Queen Mary College provides preschool, primary, secondary, undergraduate as well as postgraduate education and preparation for international GCE O Level examination.

History
The school was established on 10 December 1908 as Victoria May Girls High School for the education of the daughters of the elite, rulers of princely states, landed gentry, and judges. It was run on the pattern of an English public school and Englishwomen were recruited to work there. On 17 November 1911 the institution was upgraded and renamed Queen Mary College in honor of the Queen Consort of King George V of Great Britain. As most of the students observed purdah, the institution came to be known as the “Purdah School”.

Among the girls who were first admitted to the school, were Jahan Ara and Gaiti Ara who later played a key role in the freedom movement of Pakistan as Begum Jahan Ara Shahnawaz and Begum Gaiti Ara Bashir Ahmad. Begum Shahnawaz also worked for the welfare of her alma mater and remained the president of the Advisory Committee of the college for years. Many other prominent ladies of Lahore, like Lady Fazl-e-Hussain and Lady Abdul Qadir, were members of this Committee.

Established as a school for the daughters of the rich and powerful, Queen Mary College, after independence, removed the old restrictions on admission and opened its gates to applicants from all sections of society. It became a degree College in 1966 and a center for Postgraduate classes in 2003.

In January 1998, Queen Mary College was granted autonomous status.

Queen Mary College, starting with a group of only 11 students, now has about 7,000 students with a faculty of 244 members.

Academics
Education is imparted from Class 1 to the Postgraduate level. It comprises four sections and each section is supervised by a Section Head. The principal is the Chief Administrator. The sections are Junior, Senior, College and the Postgraduate Section.

See also
 Kinnaird College for Women
 Queen Mary's College, Chennai

References

External links

 

 
Educational institutions established in 1908
Schools in Lahore
High schools in Pakistan
Women's universities and colleges in Pakistan
1908 establishments in British India